Jandala may refer to one of several places and polity in modern Pakistan :

 Jandala, Khyber Pakhtunkhwa, a town in Khyber Pakhtunkhwa
 Jandala, Poonch, a village in Poonch district of Azad Kashmir
 Jandala (Samahni Valley), a village in the Bhimber district of Azad Kashmir
 Jandala State, a former princely state on the North Frontier, presently in Pakistani Punjab